Osornio is a surname. Notable people with the surname include:

Agustina López de Osornio (1769–1845), Argentine noble lady
Arturo Osornio (born 1953), Mexican politician
Clemente López de Osornio (1720–1783), Spanish military leader
Enrique Cornelio Osornio Martínez de los Ríos (1868–1945), Mexican politician and general
Erick Osornio (born 1983), Mexican taekwondo practitioner
Francisco López Osornio (c.1640-1700s), Spanish military leader
Francisco López de Osornio Merlo (1681–1750), Spanish military leader and  landowner
Ramón López de Osornio (1685–1750), Spanish landowner, who served as Captain of provincial militias of Buenos Aires
Saturnino Osornio (1896–1976), Mexican governor of Querétaro from 1931 to 1934